Lichiqucha (Quechua lichi milk (a borrowing from Spanish leche), qucha lake, "milk lake", also spelled Lichicocha) is a mountain at a small lake of that name in the Andes of Peru which reaches an altitude of approximately . It is located in the Junín Region, Yauli Province, Yauli District, and in the Lima Region, Huarochirí Province,  Chicla District. Lichiqucha lies southwest of Wayrakancha.

References

Mountains of Peru
Mountains of Lima Region
Mountains of Junín Region
Lakes of Junín Region